Winde is a village in the Dutch province of Drenthe. It is a part of the municipality of Tynaarlo, and lies about 10 km south of Groningen.

The village was first mentioned in 1338 as de Winde. The etymology is unclear. Winde was home to 53 people in 1840.

References

Populated places in Drenthe
Tynaarlo